Ivan Ivanovych Iskra (died July, 14, 1708) was a colonel of Poltava (1696–1703). Iskra belonged to the anti-Hetmanate coalition led by Vasily Kochubey. In late 1707, Kochubey and Iskra delivered a letter to the Tsar's court that accused Ivan Mazepa of initiating talks with Stanislaus Leszczynski of Poland and Charles XII of Sweden.

Peter I did not believe the letter and beheaded them both. Later, when the Tsar realized that they were correct, they were reburied near the Refectory Church in Kiev Pechersk Monastery.

References

Politicians of the Russian Empire
Colonels of the Cossack Hetmanate
Year of birth missing
1708 deaths
18th-century executions by Russia
People executed by Russia by decapitation
18th-century Ukrainian people
Burials at the Refectory Church, Kyiv Pechersk Lavra